Dol-Mandir, also known as Dol-Mandav is a Hindu temple of the Puthia Temple Complex in Puthia Upazila, Rajshahi Division, Bangladesh. It is located within the Puthia market area. An inscription dates the temple to 1778 built by Vubanendra Narayan, the Panch Ani Raja.

Features
It is a four storied edifice built in brick masonry. At each successive floor the size gets proportionally reduced with the top floor built to square plan, similar to the Panch Mahal in Fatehpur Sikri or Mandvi in Baroda, India. Each of the four floors of the temple has a facade made of a series of arches. The top floor square chamber is crowned with a ribbed dome which is fitted with a spire or kalasha. The surfaces of external and internal walls are simply plastered.

See also
 List of archaeological sites in Bangladesh

References

Puthia Temple Complex
Archaeological sites in Rajshahi District